Leave London is the first EP by British ska and indie band Kid British.

It was released on 1 January 2009 on digital download and 10" vinyl.

Track listing
"She Will Leave"
"Elizabeth"
"Lost in London"

References

2009 debut EPs
Kid British albums
Mercury Records EPs